The Ambassador of the United Kingdom to Panama is the United Kingdom's foremost diplomatic representative in the Republic of Panama.

List of heads of mission

Envoy Extraordinary and Minister Plenipotentiary
1914–1919: Sir Claude Mallet Consul from 1904, Minister Resident from 1907, Envoy Extraordinary and Minister Plenipotentiary from 1914
1920–1923: Andrew Bennett
1923–1931: Charles Wallis
1931–1934: Sir Josiah Crosby
1934–1939: Frederick Adam
1939–1943: Charles Dodd
1943–1946: Stanley Irving
1946–1950: John Greenway
1950–1953: Eric Cleugh

Ambassador Extraordinary and Plenipotentiary
1953–1955: Eric Cleugh
1955–1960: Sir Ian Henderson
1960–1963: Sir Edgar Vaughan
1964–1966: Sir Alan Williams
1966–1969: The Hon. Henry Hankey
1969–1970: Ronald Scrivener
1971–1974: Dugald Malcolm
1974–1978: Robert John
1978–1980: John Sanders
1981–1983: Stanley Stephenson
1983–1986: Terence Steggle
1986–1989: Margaret Bryan
1989–1992: John MacDonald
1992–1996: Thomas Malcomson
1996–1999: William Sinton
1999–2002: Glyn Davies
2002–2006: James Malcolm
2006–2011: Richard Austen
2012–2013: Michael Holloway
2013–2017: Ian Collard 

2017–: Damion Potter

References

External links
UK and Panama, gov.uk

Panama
 
United Kingdom